Anyphaenoides is a genus of anyphaenid sac spiders first described by Lucien Berland in 1913. It is a senior synonym of "Quechuella"

Species
 it contains twenty species from Central and South America:
Anyphaenoides brescoviti Baert, 1995 – Peru
Anyphaenoides caribensis Martínez, Brescovit & Martinez, 2018 – Colombia
Anyphaenoides clavipes (Mello-Leitão, 1922) – Brazil, Argentina
Anyphaenoides cocos Baert, 1995 – Costa Rica (Cocos Is.)
Anyphaenoides coddingtoni Brescovit, 1998 – Brazil, Bolivia
Anyphaenoides enigmatica Martínez, Brescovit & Martinez, 2018 – Colombia
Anyphaenoides foreroi Martínez, Brescovit & Martinez, 2018 – Colombia
Anyphaenoides hilli Martínez, Brescovit & Martinez, 2018 – Colombia
Anyphaenoides irusa Brescovit, 1992 – Venezuela, Suriname, Leeward Antilles
Anyphaenoides katiae Baert, 1995 – Ecuador (Galapagos Is.)
Anyphaenoides locksae Brescovit & Ramos, 2003 – Brazil
Anyphaenoides octodentata (Schmidt, 1971) – Venezuela, Ecuador, Peru, Galapagos Is.
Anyphaenoides pacifica (Banks, 1902) – Trinidad to Chile, Galapagos Is.
Anyphaenoides placens (O. Pickard-Cambridge, 1896) – Panama, Venezuela
Anyphaenoides pluridentata Berland, 1913 – Ecuador
Anyphaenoides samiria Brescovit, 1998 – Peru
Anyphaenoides sialha Brescovit, 1992 – Peru
Anyphaenoides sierraensis Martínez, Brescovit & Martinez, 2018 – Colombia
Anyphaenoides volcan Brescovit, 1998 – Panama
Anyphaenoides xiboreninho Brescovit, 1998 – Brazil

References

Anyphaenidae
Araneomorphae genera
Spiders of Central America
Spiders of South America
Taxa named by Lucien Berland